Phaphril is a village of Union Council Mussiari Murree Tehsil in the Murree District of Punjab, Pakistan.

Geography 
It is located in the south-east of the Murree Tehsil and is bounded to the north by Jhika Gali, to the south by Angoori, Murree, to the west by Numbal and to the east by Murree Expressway - N75. The village is home to Sozo Adventure Park.

Demographics 
It had a population of 2700.

Schools and education 
The villages hosts three government schools and two private schools:
 Govt Higher Secondary School Phaphril
 Govt Girls Elementary School Phaphril
 Govt Boys Primary School Sohawa Phaphril
 Swan Valley Secondary School Phaphril
 Iqra Residential School & College Phaphril
 Mphaphuli High school
The majority of the inhabitants are Abbasi. Other tribes such as the Qureshi, Mughal, Awan and Rajput (Khakha) inhabit the area in smaller numbers.

Facilities 
Basic services and facilities include:
 Basic Health Unit Phaphril 
 Post Office Phaphril
 Women Skill Center (Dastkari)
 Dar Ul Hikmat Clinic (Mumtaz & Sons) Phaphril 
 Taxi Hire
 Fruit Market & Grocery Stores, Bakery
 Jamia Mosque
 Cricket Ground

Mosques and madrasa 
Phaphil has three mosques:
 Madrasa Kullia Tul Ghausia Lil Binat Phaphril
 Jamia Masjid Quba Ghausia Nooriya Phaphril
 Madni Masjid Sohawa Phaphril
 Anwar e Habib Masjid Pandi, lower Phaphril

Transport 
 Suzuki Carry - jeeps are common from Sain and Gohra to Lower Topa and Taxis 
 Buses and Toyota vans travel to Rawalpindi/Islamabad

References 
Usama Abbasi

.

Populated places in Murree Tehsil